The 1993 Oklahoma State Cowboys football team represented the Oklahoma State University during the 1993 NCAA Division I-A football season. They participated as members of the Big 8 Conference. They played their home games at Lewis Field in Stillwater, Oklahoma. They were coached by head coach Pat Jones.

Schedule

After the season

The 1994 NFL Draft was held on April 24–25, 1994. The following Cowboys were selected.

References

Oklahoma State
Oklahoma State Cowboys football seasons
Oklahoma State Cowboys football